MTV Party To Go Volume 9 was the ninth album in the MTV Party To Go series.  The album was certified gold on January 16, 1997, by the RIAA.

Track listing
 "1, 2, 3, 4 (Sumpin' New)" (Timber Extended Mix) – Coolio
 "Missing" (Todd Terry Club Mix) – Everything but the Girl
 "Set U Free" (Fever Mix Edit) – Planet Soul
 "Beautiful Life" (Extended 12" Mix) – Ace of Base
 "Run Away" (Club Attack Mix) – Real McCoy
 "You Remind Me of Something" (Original Mix) – R. Kelly
 "Hey Lover" (Radio Edit) – LL Cool J
 "One More Chance" (Radio Edit) – The Notorious B.I.G.*
 "Baby" (Extended LP Version) – Brandy*
 "Get On Up" (Instant Flava Mix) – Jodeci**
 "Tell Me" (Extended LP Mix) – Groove Theory
 "Throw Your Hands Up" (Extended 12" Mix) – L.V.

* Misprinted in reverse order 
** Misprinted as "Get Up On It"

References

MTV series albums
1996 compilation albums
Tommy Boy Records compilation albums
Dance music compilation albums
Rhythm and blues compilation albums